William Lock may refer to:

William Lock (1858–1940), Mayor of Nelson, New Zealand.
William Lock (MP) (?1687–1761), MP for Great Grimsby (UK Parliament constituency)

See also
William Locke (disambiguation)